A List of populated places in Morobe Province, Papua New Guinea:

A

Afong
Agaganda
Ago
Aimolau
Ainsi
Aiogi
Aiogwei
Aiuwo
Aiwamba
Akandang
Akwangi
Akwanje
Aluki
Amelingan
Amien
Amoa
Ana
Anandea
Anandor
Andandora
Andorora
Angabena
Angabu
Angau
Angeiwunga
Anggaie
Angweta
Aningi
Antiguran
Antiragin
Apalap
Apo
Arabuka
Aregenang
Arifiran
Arifogo
Aringi
Aringona
Aro
Aseki
Asini
Asolani
Atapaura
Atsuk
Atsunas
Atwara
Aupo
Au
Auno
Aven
Avenggu
Awaiepa
Aweaka

B

Badibo
Badzuluo
Baime
Bain'nu
Baiune
Bakaia Number 1
Bakaia Number 2
Bakia
Bakokono
Bakon
Balangko
Balilaua
Balum
Bamurufto
Bangalum Bridge
Bangdap
Bantamu
Bapi (7°'0"S 146°59'0"E)
Bapi (7°49'0"S 147°'0"E)
Barang
Barim
Batoro
Bau
Beding
Belombibi
Beluok
Beni
Benula
Berakwaiyu
Besibong
Biaboli
Biauwa
Biawaria
Biaweng
Bibera
Bilga
Bilimang
Birik
Biring
Bitoi
Biuingen
Black Cat
Boana
Bobadu
Bogabuang
Bogasu
Bogeba
Boisi
Bokasu
Bolimang
Bolingbongen
Boneia
Bonga
Bongganko
Bonggi
Bopirumpum
Boroke
Bua
Buakup
Buangi
Buengim
Bugaim
Bugang
Bugwer
Buharu
Buiambum
Buiane
Bukaua
Bukauasip
Buki
Bukum
Bulamanong
Bulantim
Bulcara
Bulolo
Bulu (6°2'0"S 147°'0"E)
Bulu (7°6'0"S 146°5'0"E)
Bulwat
Bumayong
Bumba
Bumbu (5°59'0"S 145°5'0"E)
Bumbu (6°'0"S 147°10'0"E)
Bungalamba
Bupu
Busama
Buseng
Busian
Busiga
Buso
Busung
Butala
Butaweng
Butibum 1
Buwai
Bwakugu
Bwambi
Bwasia
Bwussi

C-D

Chimbuluk
Chivasing
Dahu
Daia
Daku
Dakum
Dali
Dalugilomon
Danatum
Daudoro
Dawong
Dawot
Dengalu
Dengando
Derim
Derongge
Doing
Dokalang
Dolo
Domut
Dona
Drong
Dubi
Dungatung

E-F

Ebabang
Edie Creek
Efafan
Eiba
Eipa
Embewanang
Emengwaning
Erap
Erendengan
Esianda
Etaitno
Etep
Etobanga
Ewok
Ezanko
Faseu
Finschhafen
Finungwa
Fior
Fofragen
Fondengko

G

Gabagata
Gabensis
Gabmatzung
Gabsonkek
Gaieng
Galawo
Gamarok
Ganma
Gantisap
Ganzegan
Garaina
Garambon
Garawaria
Garli
Gasam
Gatseng
Gauinlabu
Gauru
Gawan
Gehan
Gemaheng (6°2'0"S 147°30'0"E)
Gemaheng (6°25'0"S 147°'0"E)
Gena
Gene
Geraun
Gerepo
Gerup
Gewak
Gilang
Gingala
Gingora
Gitua
Gitukia
Gobadik
Godowa
Gofan
Golangke
Gom (5°35'0"S 147°47'0"E)
Gom (6°19'0"S 146°38'0"E)
Gomando
Gombwato
Gomena
Gomlongon
Gorgiok
Gori
Gotet
Gowa
Guabagusal
Gubu
Gumana
Gumi
Gumun
Gunabosing
Gunazaking
Guruf
Gurukor
Gurunkor
Gusak
Gusap
Guswei
Gwado
Gwaloik
Gwang
Gwinlankor

H

Hamaronong
Hamdingnan
Hamoronong
Hamuni
Hapahondong
Hawata
Hawaweto
Hekwangi
Hem
Hemang
Hendeneng
Hengune
Hiakwata
Hiakwoto
Hikwak
Himerka
Hiwabri
Hompua
Hongo
Honpato
Honziuknan
Hoperang
Hota
Hote
Hubegong
Hudewa

I-J

Iagobei
Ibagei
Igerua
Ikyaua
Ilavu
Iloko (6°'0"S 147°'0"E)
Iloko (6°16'0"S 147°10'0"E)
Imon
Indagen
Indum
Intoap
Isan
Isosargan
Iwapu
Iwatimna
Jivevaneng

K

Kabakini
Kabong
Kabum
Kabwum
Kaiapit
Kainye
Kaisenik
Kaisia
Kakalo
Kalasu
Kaletta
Kamanahai
Kamari, Papua New Guinea
Kamaua, Papua New Guinea
Kamiaturn
Kamloa
Kampepe
Kangarua
Kanomi
Kanzarua
Kapin Number 1
Kapin Number 2
Kapiso
Karakwa
Karangan (6°'0"S 147°'0"E)
Karangan (6°20'0"S 146°38'0"E)
Kasanga
Kasangari
Kasangari Number 1
Kasangari Number 2
Kasanombe
Kasin
Kasu
Kasu 2
Kasuma
Kataipa
Katika
Katumani Hamlet
Kaumanga
Kaunangisi
Kaungko
Kaunkiol
Kaura
Kaurau
Kawaren
Keili
Kekewana
Kelanoa
Kelkel
Kemb
Kembakn
Kemburum
Kesin
Kieta
Kinalakna
Kindupu
Kingfaringau
Kip
Kipu
Kisengam
Kisituen
Kiwsawa
Kobau
Kobia
Kobiak
Kobio
Koi Iavi
Koi Iopo
Koi'ioro
Koilil
Koiyan
Koki
Kolem
Komagowatta
Komalakatcha
Komban
Komiatum
Komutu
Kondolop
Konimbo
Kopa
Koparaka
Kor
Korbau
Korenga
Korepa
Kornade
Korteio
Koru
Korumba
Kotkin
Krututa
Kudjeru
Kukuya
Kulami
Kulavi
Kumbip
Kumdarong
Kumisi
Kumukio
Kurin
Kusi
Kwadungwi
Kwagaga
Kwalansam
Kwampiang
Kwamu
Kwandagogi
Kwapsanek
Kwasang
Kwasang 2
Kwasimerga
Kwatomane
Kwekwendangu
Kwembu
Kwembung
Kwenliki
Kwenzenzeng
Kwietta

L

Lababia
Labisap
Lae
Lakala
Lakona
Lalang
Lama
Langa
Lanitzera
Latep
Laumgei
Laundi
Laurepo
Lebangande
Lega
Leklu
Leko
Lengbati
Lewamon
Logui
Lokanu
Lomalam
Longmon
Lumbaip

M

Magazain
Magedzetzu
Mainyanda
Malahang Mission
Malangata
Malanpipi
Malasiga
Mama
Mamaringan
Mambump
Mami
Mangam
Mange
Mangga
Maniag
Manki
Mape
Mapos
Maran
Mararamu
Mararuo
Mari (6°12'0"S 146°17'0"E)
Mari (6°39'0"S 146°'0"E)
Marilinan
Masa
Masangko
Mawaning
Meiawa
Mek
Mekini
Melandum
Menya
Menyamya
Menyi
Meri Creek
Merikeo
Mimi
Mindik
Mismis
Missim
Mo
Moikisung
Momalili
Morago
Moreng
Motete
Mouini
Mula
Mumeng
Mumeng 2
Mumengtein
Mumum
Mumunggan
Mundala
Mungo
Muniau
Muniwa
Munkip
Munum
Mup
Musep
Musom

N

Nabak
Nadzab
Nako
Nama
Namie
Nanda
Nanduo
Narawapum
Nariawang
Narowaine
Nasawasiang
Nasingalatu
Nauti (7°16'0"S 146°'0"E)
Nauti (7°19'0"S 146°35'0"E)
Neiet'nda
Nemau Hamlet
Nemnem
Nengit
New Yunzain
Ngaragooma
Ngasawapum
Nguzi
Nima
Nimbako
Nineia
Nomanene
Nuk Nuk
Numbut
Numenga
Nuzen

O

Ogeramnang
Oiwa
Old Bangalum
Old Yunzain
Oligadu
Omalai
Omili
Omisuan
Ondatera
Onga
Onggake
Onuk
Oomsis
Opai
Orarako
Oropot
Otibanda

P

Pafiu
Pagua
Papekani
Parorora
Passaia
Patep Number 1
Patep Number 2
Pauamunga
Paukwanga
Peawa
Peila
Peisu
Pelenkwa
Pendeng
Perakles
Pesen
Pilimung
Pinang
Pindiu
Pingamunga
Pobung
Podzorong
Poiyu
Popoi
Posei
Puahom Yanga
Puleng

Q-S

Qaga
Rarabo
Rebafu
Ririwo
Ros Kar
Rua
Sadou
Safifi (6°29'0"S 147°32'0"E)
Safifi (6°'0"S 147°36'0"E)
Sagaiyo
Saiko
Sakam
Samantiki
Samanzing
Sambangan
Sambe
Samberang
Sambiang
Sambio
Sambori
Sambue
Samep
Sam Sam Number 1
Sam Sam Number 2
Sananga
Sanaronong
Sangan
Sangas
Sanon
Sanzeng
Sapa
Sapanda
Sape
Satneng
Satop
Satpagna
Satwag
Saungne
Saureli
Scharnhorst
Selebop
Selepet
Selimbeng
Semgeta
Serepo
Shon'hau
Siaga
Siang (5°59'0"S 146°58'0"E)
Siang (6°25'0"S 146°'0"E)
Siapan
Sikam
Sikikia
Sikwong
Sililio
Silimana
Simbang
Simbeng
Singaua
Singeiapa
Singor
Singorokai
Sipa
Sisi
Siu (6°22'0"S 147°2'0"E)
Siu (7°5'0"S 147°37'0"E)
Sivebo
Siwea
Siyugei
Slate Creek
Sokaneng
Sokelen
Songgin
Sopa
Sorong
Sosoninko
Soweng
Suewitne
Sugan
Sugu
Sukurum
Sumu
Sunde
Sunshine
Sutang

T

Tahmas
Taiak
Takop
Tali
Tamigudu
Tamoi
Tarawe
Tareko
Tau'inni
Tauknawe
Tauris
Tekadu
Tereran
Tiferan
Tigedu
Tikeling
Tiku
Timanogosa
Timne
Timowong
Tipsit
Tiren
Tirimure
Titauwawi
Tobaigo
Tokanin
Tori
Totomea
Towat
Tsile Tsile
Tsinjangogwi
Tumbuna (6°35'0"S 146°9'0"E)
Tumbuna (6°37'0"S 146°5'0"E)
Tumnang
Tumung
Tunge

U-V

Ubaneng
Ukilim
Ulugudu
Uluor
Umba (7°'0"S 145°58'0"E)
Umba (7°2'0"S 145°58'0"E)
Umdamna
Ungesu
Ununu
Upat
Vemop

W

Wabazeira
Wagang
Waganluhu
Wagazaring
Wago
Waiganda
Wain Camp
Wainsodina
Waipali
Walingai
Wampangan
Wamuri
Wanam
Wandini
Wandokai
Wandumi
Wanimbun
Wantoat
Wap
Wapalala
Waran
Wareo
Wasin
Wau
Wauit
Wauwoga
Wavit
Wekae
Were Were
Wetna
Wideru
Windowi
Winima
Wisi
Woimbo
Wompul
Wongat
Worin
Wowas
Wudjini
Wudzi
Wunangapan
Wununga
Wuru
Wuruf
Wuwu

Waria

Y

Yagepa
Yagoine
Yakot
Yalu
Yamanzako
Yambo
Yambong
Yampua
Yandu
Yanga
Yangla
Yanta
Yanuf
Yapang
Yari
Yasingli
Yatsing
Yauwipu
Yawan
Yeggie
Yeiweni
Yelaua
Yemli
Yinimba
Yokua
Yowong
Yunggu

Z

Zafilio
Zagahemi
Zakubep
Zalimpa
Zanggung
Zankoa
Zare
Zenag
Zengaren
Zenguru
Zewitzan (6°25'0"S 147°20'0"E)
Zewitzan (6°'0"S 147°2'0"E)
Zezaging
Zinaba
Zingko
Zitari
Zongafifi
Zoroge
Zunzumua

External links
Maplandia list

Populated places in Morobe Province